Dionisio de Santos, O.P.  (died 1577) was a Roman Catholic prelate who served as Bishop of Cartagena (1574–1577).

Biography
Dionisio de Santos was born in Spain and ordained a priest in the Order of Preachers.
On 25 Jun 1574, he was appointed during the papacy of Pope Gregory XIII as Bishop of Cartagena.
On Dec 1575, he was consecrated bishop by Luis Zapata de Cárdenas, Archbishop of Santafé en Nueva Granada. 
He served as Bishop of Cartagena until his death on 9 Sep 1577.

References

External links and additional sources
 (for Chronology of Bishops) 
 (for Chronology of Bishops) 

16th-century Roman Catholic bishops in New Granada
Bishops appointed by Pope Gregory XIII
Roman Catholic bishops of Cartagena in Colombia
1577 deaths
Dominican bishops